Feodor Vasiliyevich Kuritsyn (? - died no earlier than 1500) was a Russian statesman, philosopher and a poet. 
As a government official and a diplomat, Kuritsyn exerted great influence on the Russian foreign policy in the times of Ivan III. In 1482, he was sent to the Hungarian king Matthias Corvinus to conclude an anti-Polish alliance. In 1494, Kuritsyn was sent to Lithuania for the same purpose. He took part in many negotiations with foreign statesmen in Moscow.

In 1485, Kuritsyn created a club, which later would be considered heretical. He was against monasteries and monasticism, expressed ideas about freedom of human will ("autocracy of the soul"), which he would interpret in a much broader sense than it was allowed by the orthodox theology. 

Kuritsyn's name was last mentioned in 1500, when Ivan III gradually changed his attitude towards heretics thanks to hegumen Joseph Volotsky, who had been Kuritsyn's staunch opponent. The tsar's leniency gave way to persecution, which would put an end to activities of Kuritsyn's club. Ivan III, however, spared Kuritsyn due to Volotsky's obvious exaggerations in his accusations.

Works 
Kuritsyn authored numerous literary works, of which two survive to this day—a philosophical poem titled The Laodicean Missive, as well as the poetic novel The Legend of the Voijevoda Dracula.

References

Russian diplomats
People of the Grand Duchy of Moscow
1500s deaths
Year of birth unknown